The Norwegian Model-142 is an anti-tank variant of the American M113 armoured personnel carrier (APC), the difference being that it is equipped with a TOW2 turret developed in Norway by Kværner Eureka.

Armament 
The NM-142 mounts a turret containing a TOW2 guided anti-tank missile system, with one launch tube on each side of the turret.

Additionally, mounted on the commander's hatch, there is an MG3 machine gun for use as secondary armament and in situations where the TOW2-system is unsuitable.

Organization 
The vehicle has a crew of four. The commander leads the crew, including designating targets, operating communication systems and navigating. The gunner is responsible for operating and maintaining the TOW2 weapon system. The loader assists the gunner, especially by reloading the launch tubes whenever necessary. Finally, the driver maneuvers the APC and is responsible for maintaining the engine, treads and other driving mechanisms.

Usually, a platoon consists of four NM-142s, led by a lieutenant (who also is the commander on one of the NM-142s). In some cases, three platoons are put together to constitute an anti-tank squadron, but individual platoons are also incorporated in various mechanized formations.

The Norwegian Army had approximately 100 NM-142s. By the end of the service life, all but 12 were withdrawn from service. These received some modifications and then named NM-142F1. As of 2021, all NM142 and NM142Fs have been withdrawn from active service.
Other nations have made variants using the same turret on other vehicles (Canada and Saudi Arabia).

See also
M901 ITV, a similar American M113 variant

External links 
TOW page at Scandinavian Armor - some more details and statistics about the APC and weapon system.

Tracked armoured fighting vehicles
Tank destroyers
Military vehicles introduced in the 1980s